George S. Watts (July 12, 1914 – July 11, 1990) was an American football offensive tackle in the National Football League (NFL) for the Washington Redskins.  He played college football at Appalachian State University and was drafted in the seventeenth round of the 1942 NFL Draft. He was the first player in Appalachian State school history to be drafted by the NFL.

External links
 
 

1914 births
1990 deaths
American football offensive tackles
Appalachian State Mountaineers football players
Washington Redskins players
People from Gaston County, North Carolina
Players of American football from North Carolina